Victor Lafay (born 17 January 1996, in Lyon) is a French cyclist, who currently rides for UCI WorldTeam . In October 2020, he was named in the startlist for the 2020 Vuelta a España.

Major results

2014
 1st  Overall Tour du Valromey
1st Stages 2 & 3
2017
 1st  Road race, National Under–23 Road Championships
 7th Overall Grand Prix Priessnitz spa
 9th Overall Rhône-Alpes Isère Tour
 9th Overall Tour de Savoie Mont Blanc
2018
 1st Stage 2 Tour de Savoie Mont Blanc
 2nd  Road race, UEC European Under–23 Road Championships
2021
 1st Stage 8 Giro d'Italia
 3rd Overall Arctic Race of Norway
1st  Young rider classification
 4th Overall Volta a la Comunitat Valenciana
1st  Young rider classification
2022
 2nd Classic Grand Besançon Doubs
 5th Overall Arctic Race of Norway
1st Stage 3
 6th Trofeo Laigueglia
2023
 4th Faun-Ardèche Classic

Grand Tour general classification results timeline

References

External links

1996 births
Living people
French male cyclists
Cyclists from Lyon
French Giro d'Italia stage winners